Ethnic Georgians in Ukraine number around 34,199.

Notable Georgians that lived/worked in Ukraine includes famous poet David Guramishvili , Mikhail Saakashvili, who was the governor of the Odessa Oblast from May 2015 until November 2016, and Georgiy Gongadze, a journalist and film director who was kidnapped and murdered in September of 2000 near Kyiv.

See also 
Georgia–Ukraine relations
Ukrainians in Georgia

References 

Georgian diaspora
Ethnic groups in Ukraine